Lennart or Lennarth is a Germanic variant of the name Leonard, most common in Scandinavia and German-speaking countries as a surname or masculine given name. Notable people with the name include:

Surname
Camilla Lennarth (born 1988), Swedish golfer
Isobel Lennart (1915–1971), American screenwriter and playwright
Sonja de Lennart (born 1920), German fashion designer

Given name

A–E
Lennart Alexandersson (born 1947), Swedish footballer, father of football players Niclas and Daniel Alexandersson
Lennart Åqvist (born 1932), Swedish logician
Lennart Askinger (1922–1995), Swedish football defender
Lennart Atterwall (1911–2001), Swedish javelin thrower and European champion
Lennart Augustsson, Swedish computer scientist
Lennart Axelsson (musician) (born 1941), Swedish trumpet player
Lennart Axelsson (politician) (born 1953), Swedish politician, member of the Riksdag
Lennart Beijer (born 1947), Swedish Left Party politician, member of the Riksdag 1994–2006
Lennart Bengtsson, Swedish meteorologist currently interested in global climate modelling
Lennart Bergelin (1925–2008), Swedish tennis player and coach
Lennart Bernadotte, Count of Wisborg (1909–2004), Prince of Sweden and Duke of Småland from 1909 to 1932
Lennart Bodström (1928–2015), Swedish politician, Minister for Foreign Affairs from 1982 to 1985
Lennart Bohman (1909–1979), Swedish boxer
Lennart Bunke (1912–1988), Swedish football forward
Lennart Carleson (born 1928), Swedish mathematician
Lennart Carlström (born 1943), Swedish orienteering competitor
Lennart Daléus (born 1946), Swedish politician, leader of the Swedish Centre Party from 1998 to 2001
Lennart Dozzi (1910–1987), Swedish canoeist
Lennarth Ebbinge (born 1956), Swedish handball player
Lennart Ekdahl (1912–2005), Swedish sailor
Lennart Eriksson (musician) (born 1956), the bass player in the Swedish punk rock band Ebba Grön
Lennart Eriksson (handballer) (born 1944), Swedish handball player

F–L
Lennart Fremling (1946–2013), Swedish Liberal People's Party politician
Lennart Geijer (1909–1999), Swedish politician and lawyer
Lennart Ginman (born 1960), Danish bassist, composer and music producer
Lennart Green (born 1941), Swedish magician, world champion close-up/card magician
Lennart Gripenberg (1852–1933), Finnish politician
Lennart Gustavsson (born 1954), Swedish Left Party politician
Lennart Hannelius (1893–1950), Finnish sport shooter
Lennart Hartmann (born 1991), German footballer
Lennart Hedmark (born 1944), Swedish track and field athlete
Lennart Hedquist (born 1943), Swedish politician of the Moderate Party
Lennart Heimer (1930–2007), Swedish-American neuroscientist and educator
Lennart Hellsing (1919–2015), son of the merchant Paul Hellsing and his wife Sigrid
Lennart Hjulström (1938–2022), Swedish actor and director
Lennart Hyland (1919–1993), Swedish TV-show host and journalist
Lennart Jähkel (born 1956), Swedish actor
Lennart Johansson (1929–2019), Swedish football administrator, president of the Union of European Football Associations from 1990 to 2007
Lennart Johansson (ice hockey) (1941–2010), Swedish professional ice hockey player
Lennart Johnsson (born 1944), Swedish computer scientist and engineer
Lennart Klingström (1916–1994), Swedish sprint canoeist
Lennart Klockare (born 1945), Swedish social democratic politician
Lennart Kollberg, fictional character in the books by Maj Sjöwall and Per Wahlöö
Lennart Kollmats (born 1943), Swedish Liberal People's Party politician
Lennart Koskinen (born 1944), clergyman in the Church of Sweden, serving as bishop in Visby
Lennart Larsson (cross-country skier) (1930–2021), Swedish cross-country skier
Lennart Larsson (footballer) (born 1953), Swedish footballer
Lennart Lindgren (1915–1952), Swedish Olympic sprinter
Lennart Lindgren (Swedish Navy officer) (1919–2013)
Lennart Lindroos (1886–1921), Finnish breaststroke swimmer
Lennart Ljung (engineer) (born 1946), Swedish Professor in the Chair of Control Theory at Linköping University since 1976
Lennart Ljung (general) (1921–1990), Swedish Army general

M–Z
Lennart Magnusson (1924–2011), Swedish fencer
Lennart Mathiasen (born 1948), Danish sprint canoeist who competed in the early 1970s
Lennart Meri (1928–2006), Estonian writer, film director and statesman, President of Estonia from 1992 to 2001
Lennart Nilsson (1922–2017), Swedish photographer and scientist
Lennart Nilsson (born 1944), Swedish politician
Lennart Nylander (1901–1966), Swedish diplomat
Lennart Olsson (born 1961), Swedish zoologist & embryologist, professor of comparative zoology at the Friedrich Schiller University of Jena
Lennart Petrell (born 1984), Finnish professional ice hockey player
Lennart Poettering (born 1980), German software engineer
Lennart Rodhe (1916–2005), Swedish artist, painter and printmaker
Lennart Rönnback (1905–2007), Finnish White Guard veteran of the Finnish Civil War of 1918
Lennart Rönnberg (born 1938), Swedish Army major general
Lennart Roslund (born 1946), Swedish sailor
Lennart Samuelsson (1924–2012), football player from Sweden
Lennart Sandin (1919–1991), Swedish bobsledder who competed in the early 1950s
Lennart Skoglund (1929–1975), Swedish football player
Lennart Söderberg (born 1941), Swedish football manager and former football player
Lennart Steffensen (born 1977), Norwegian football midfielder
Lennart Stekelenburg (born 1986), Dutch swimmer who is specialized in breaststroke
Lennart Stenberg, Swedish author of Den nya nordiska floran
Lennart Strand (1921–2004), Swedish middle-distance runner, 1500 m silver medallist at the 1948 London Summer Olympics
Lennart Strandberg (1915–1989), Swedish athlete who competed mainly in the 100 metres at the 1936 Olympics in Berlin
Lennart Svedberg (1944–1972), Swedish ice hockey defenceman
Lennart Swahn (1927–2008), Swedish journalist and radio and television personality
Lennart Thy (born 1992), German footballer
Lennart Torstenson (1603–1651), Count of Ortala, Baron of Virestad (1603–1651), Swedish Field Marshal and military engineer
Lennart Viitala (1921–1966), Finnish freestyle wrestler and Olympic champion
Lennart von Post (1884–1951), Swedish naturalist and geologist
Lennart Wass (born 1953), Swedish football manager
Lennart Wing (born 1935), Swedish international footballer who played in defence

See also
Lenaerts, a surname
Lenard, a surname
Lenhart, a surname
Municipality of Lenart, a small town and municipality in northeastern Slovenia
Lennert (disambiguation)
Leonard (disambiguation)

Danish masculine given names
Estonian masculine given names
Swedish masculine given names